Bruno Barbey (13 February 1941 – 9 November 2020) was a Moroccan-born French photographer. Throughout his four-decade career he traveled across five continents, photographing many wars.

Life and work
Barbey was born in Morocco. His father was a diplomat. In 1959/1960 studied photography and graphic arts at the Ecole des Arts et Métiers in Vevey, Switzerland. During the 1960s he was commissioned to photograph European and African countries by Editions Rencontre in Lausanne. In 1964 Barbey began a relationship with Magnum Photos, becoming an Associate member in 1966, and a full member in 1968, at which time he was photographing student riots in Paris. He eventually served as Magnum vice president for Europe in 1978 and 1979 and from 1992 to 1995 as President of Magnum International.

He spent 1979 to 1981 photographing Poland, resulting in his book Poland. He rejected the label of 'war photographer', although he became renown for photographing conflicts as well as unusual, beautiful images. He covered civil wars in Nigeria, Vietnam, the Middle East, Cambodia, Northern Ireland, Iraq, Kuwait and the liberation war in Bangladesh. From 2005 Barbey pursued, among other work, a project on Istanbul.

Death
Barbey died on 9 November 2020 at the age of 79 in Orbais l’Abbaye, France.

Awards
French National Order of Merit
Overseas Press Club Award
Photojournalism Award, University of Missouri

Publications

Publications by Barbey
Naples. Switzerland: Rencontre, 1964.
Camargue. Switzerland: Rencontre, 1964.
Portugal. Switzerland: Rencontre, 1966.
Kenya. Switzerland: Rencontre, 1966.
Koweït. Switzerland: Rencontre, 1967.
Ecosse. Switzerland: Rencontre, 1968.
 Ceylan. France: André Barret, 1974.
Iran. Jeune Afrique, 1976.
Nigeria. France: Jeune Afrique, 1978.
Bombay. Netherlands: Time & Life, 1979.
Pologne. France: Arthaud, 1982.
Le Gabon. France: Chêne, 1984.
Portugal. Germany: Hoffmann & Campe, 1988.
Fès, immobile, immortelle. France: Imprimerie Nationale, 1996.
Gens des nuages. France: Stock, 1997.
Mai 68. France: Différence, 1998.
Photo Poche. France: Nathan, 1999.
Essaouira. France: Chêne, 2000.
Les Italiens. France: Martinière, 2002.
Maroc. France: Martinière, 2003.
 1968, Bruno Barbey. Istanbul, Turkey: Fotografevi, 2008.
 Italyanlar / Italians. Turkey: Yapi Kredi, 2008.
Bruno Barbey's Istanbul. Turkey: Yapi Kredi, 2009.
Passages. Paris: La Martinière, 2015. . Bilingual English and French.

Publications with contributions by Barbey
Magnum Contact Sheets. Edited by Kristen Lubben.
Magnum Contact Sheets. London: Thames & Hudson, 2011. .
Magnum Contact Sheets. London: Thames & Hudson, 2014. . Compact edition.
Magnum Contact Sheets: The Collector's Edition: Bruno Barbey, Paris Riots, 1968. London: Thames & Hudson, 2011. .

Films
The Bakery Girl of Monceau (1963) – directed by Éric Rohmer, cinematography by Barbey
Mai 68 (1968) – 16 mm, B&W
3 Jours, 3 Photographes (1979) – directed by F. Moscovitz; about Barbey, Jean Loup Sieff and Robert Doisneau
Assignment in Morocco (1988) – BBC, directed by Clem Vallance; in conjunction with centenary of National Geographic
Maroc sans Frontière (1996) – directed by Mostafa Bouazzaoui for Moroccan television
Les Italiens (2002) – directed by Caroline Thiénot; betanum, 10 mins
Panoramiques Maroc (2003) – Caroline Thiénot; betanum, 12 mins
Grand Angle (2005) – 2M, Maroc
Mai 68 vu par Bruno Barbey (2008) – Caroline Thienot

Collections
Barbey's work is held in the following collection:
Magnum Photos: Photographic Collection at the Harry Ransom Center, University of Texas at Austin

References

External links
 
 Magnum biography
 Euro Visions 

2020 deaths
1941 births
Arts et Métiers ParisTech alumni
Magnum photographers
French photojournalists
Photography in Iran
Photography in Turkey
20th-century French photographers
21st-century French photographers